The 2022 Women's Euro Beach Soccer League was the second edition of the Women's Euro Beach Soccer League (WEBSL). It is the annual, premier competition in European beach soccer contested between women's national teams, succeeding the Women's Euro Beach Soccer Cup (2016–19). Organised by Beach Soccer Worldwide (BSWW), it is the women's version of the men's long-running Euro Beach Soccer League, which began in 1998.

The league consisted of two phases: two rounds of fixtures comprising the regular season, and the Superfinal, in which the top four teams qualified to then directly contest the league title, with the winners becoming WEBSL champions.

The league also acted as the qualification route to the 2023 European Games; the top five teams qualified to join hosts Poland.

Russia were defending champions, but were banned from entering the competition this year. The competition was won by Spain for the first time who claimed their second European crown following the 2016 Women's Euro Beach Soccer Cup.

Teams
Six teams took part this season. 

 In accordance with sanctions imposed by FIFA and UEFA in response to the 2022 Russian invasion of Ukraine, the defending champions, the Russian national team, was banned from entering.

The numbers in parentheses show the European ranking of each team prior to the start of the season, out of 9 nations.

 (1st)
 (3rd)
 (5th)
 (7th)
 (8th)
 (n/a)

Notes
 a: Teams making their debut.

Regular season

Awards 
The following awards were presented after the conclusion of the first round of matches in Nazaré.

Superfinal

Consolation

Fifth place match

Final four

Semi-finals

Third place match

Superfinal match

Awards

Winners trophy

Individual awards

Final standings

 
b.

Top scorers
The following table list the top 10 scorers of the 2022 WEBSL, including goals scored in both the regular and post season events.

Sources: Matchdays 1–3, Matchdays 4–5 and Superfinal

See also
2022 Euro Beach Soccer League (men's)

References

External links
Beach Soccer Worldwide, official website
Regular season
Women's Euro Beach Soccer League 2022, at ZeroZero.pt (in Portuguese)

Euro Beach Soccer League
Women's Euro Beach Soccer League
Women's Euro Beach Soccer League
Women's Euro Beach Soccer League
Euro Beach Soccer League
Euro Beach Soccer League
Beach soccer at the 2023 European Games